Anonym.OS was a Live CD operating system based on OpenBSD 3.8 with strong encryption and anonymization tools. The goal of the project was to provide secure, anonymous web browsing access to everyday users. The operating system was OpenBSD 3.8, although many packages have been added to facilitate its goal. It used Fluxbox as its window manager.

The project was discontinued after the release of Beta 4 (2006).

Distributed

Designed, created and distributed by kaos.theory/security.research.

Legacy

Although this specific project is no longer updated, its successors are Incognito OS (discontinued in 2008) and FreeSBIE.

See also 

 Comparison of BSD operating systems
 Security-focused operating system

References

External links
 Anonym.OS's SourceForge website
 Anonym.OS at DistroWatch

OpenBSD
Operating system distributions bootable from read-only media
Privacy software
Tor (anonymity network)